Mga Kuwento ng Apo is the tenth studio album of the Filipino trio Apo Hiking Society, released in 1988 under WEA Records.

Track listing
"Syotang Pa-Class" (4:13)
"Huwag Masanay sa Pagmamahal" (3:23)
"Wala Nang Hahanapin Pa" (3:51)
"Mahal Pa Rin Kita" (4:21)
"Alipin ng Mundo" (4:15)
"Di Na Natuto" (4:53)
"Awit ng Barkada" (3:38)
"Magkikita Rin Tayo" (3:35)
"Sa Bawat Umaga" (4:07)
"Piece of the Peace" (4:04)

Related links
The Official Apo Hiking Society Website

1988 albums
APO Hiking Society albums